Dover School District is an independent public school district whose district office is located in Dover, New Hampshire.

District Office 
The district office address is:

McConnell Center
61 Locust Street
Dover, NH 03820

The district office phone numbers are:

(603) 516-6800

Schools 
The district consists of the following schools:

Dover High School is also home to the regional Career Technical Center (CTC).

School Board 
The Dover school board consists of 9 members:

 7 Community members.
 1 Superintendent.
 1 Student representative.

History

References

External links 
 Official Web Site

School districts in New Hampshire
Education in Strafford County, New Hampshire